Ruth Hege Howes (born 1944) is an American nuclear physicist, expert on nuclear weapons, and historian of science, known for her books on women in physics.

Education and career
Howes has a doctorate in physics from Columbia University.
She joined the faculty at Ball State University in 1976, and became George and Frances Ball Distinguished Professor of Physics and Astronomy there; she retired as professor emerita from Ball State in 2003, to become chair of physics at Marquette University.

She has also served as an American Association for the Advancement of Science Congressional Fellow, as program director for undergraduate physics programs at the National Science Foundation, as president of the American Association of Physics Teachers for 2000–2001, and as chair of the American Physical Society Forum on Education.

Books
With Caroline Herzenberg, Howes is the coauthor of Their Day in the Sun: Women of the Manhattan Project (Temple University Press, 1999) and of After the War: Women in Physics in the United States (Morgan Claypool Press, 2015)

With Anthony Fainberg, she edited The Energy Sourcebook (American Institute of Physics, 1991). With Michael R. Stevenson, she edited Women and the Use of Military Force (Lynne Rienner Publishers, 1993).

Recognition
In 1992, Howes was elected as a Fellow of the American Physical Society, after a nomination from the APS Forum on Physics and Society, "for her innovations in the verification of ballistic missile characteristics, which assisted in resolving problems negotiating parts of the Start Treaty, and for her analyses of energy policy and ballistic missile defenses".

References

1944 births
Living people
American physicists
American women physicists
American historians of science
American women historians
Columbia Graduate School of Arts and Sciences alumni
Marquette University faculty
Ball State University faculty
Fellows of the American Physical Society
21st-century American women